Selections from The Bells of St. Mary's is a studio album of phonograph records by Bing Crosby released in 1946 featuring songs that were presented in the American musical comedy-drama film The Bells of St. Mary's.

Chart performance
The original 78rpm album reached number one on the Billboard Best-Selling Popular Record Albums chart in March 1946.

Track listing
These newly-issued songs were featured on a 2-disc, 78 rpm album set, Decca Album No. A-410.

Other releases
Decca released a dual 10” LP of Going My Way and The Bells of St. Mary's on Decca DL 5052 in 1949.

References

Bing Crosby albums
1946 albums
Decca Records albums